Nino Nakashidze (also spelled as Nakachidze)(13 January 1872 — 2 July 1963) was a Georgian writer. She was primarily known for her writings involving children and their treatment in what she viewed as a flawed system. She was also a political activist and took part in the Revolution of 1905 and subsequent upheavals, which earned her a brief exile in 1908 to the Vyatka Governorate. It is in this time period that she wrote some of her more somber titles, such as "Execution of Aspiroz"(ასპიროზის დახვრეტ) and a play "Who is Guilty"(ვინ არის დამნაშავე).

See also
 Nakashidze

References

1872 births
1963 deaths
Nobility of Georgia (country)
20th-century people from Georgia (country)
Burials at Didube Pantheon
People from Guria
20th-century writers from Georgia (country)
20th-century women writers from Georgia (country)